= Pavarotti Forever =

Compilation album by Luciano Pavarotti
- Released: 7 September 2007
- Genre: Classical
- Length: 146:56
- Label: Decca

Luciano Pavarotti chronology
Luciano Pavarotti: The Barcelona Concert (2007)	Pavarotti Forever (2007)	Luciano Pavarotti Sings Tenor Arias (2007)

Pavarotti Forever is a compilation album, released by the Italian tenor Luciano Pavarotti on September 7, 2007 in Europe and on September 13, 2007 in North America and the rest of the world. The release features nearly two and a half hours of music and is distributed by Decca Records. Pavarotti Forever reached the Top 10 in various countries and was well received by many music critics.

== Chart positions ==
=== Weekly charts ===
Chart (2007–2010)	Peak position
Australian Albums (ARIA)	15
Austrian Albums (Ö3 Austria)	3
Belgian Albums (Ultratop Flanders)	6
Belgian Albums (Ultratop Wallonia)	2
Danish Albums (Hitlisten)	6
Dutch Albums (Album Top 100)	11
German Albums (Offizielle Top 100)	7
Hungarian Albums (MAHASZ)	7
Italian Albums (FIMI)	4
Mexican Albums (Top 100 Mexico)	14
New Zealand Albums (RMNZ)	3
Norwegian Albums (VG-lista)	16
Portuguese Albums (AFP)	2
Spanish Albums (Promusicae)	1
Swedish Albums (Sverigetopplistan)	7
Swiss Albums (Schweizer Hitparade)	12
US Billboard 200	137
US Top Classical Albums (Billboard)	3

=== Year-end charts ===
Chart (2007)	Position
Austrian Albums (Ö3 Austria)	45
Belgian Albums (Ultratop Flanders)	64
Belgian Albums (Ultratop Wallonia)	36
Dutch Albums (Album Top 100)	97
German Albums (Offizielle Top 100)	96
New Zealand Albums (RMNZ)	19
Swedish Albums (Sverigetopplistan)	27
Swiss Albums (Schweizer Hitparade)	89

Chart (2008)	Position
Belgian Albums (Ultratop Wallonia)	81

== Certifications ==
Region	Certification	Certified units/sales
Australia (ARIA) video	Platinum	15,000^{^}
France (SNEP)	Platinum	200,000^{*}
Germany (BVMI)	Gold	100,000^{^}
Hungary (MAHASZ)	Platinum	6,000^{^}
Portugal (AFP)	Gold	10,000^{^}
Sweden (GLF)	Gold	20,000^{^}
Switzerland (IFPI Switzerland)	Gold	15,000^{^}
^{*} Sales figures based on certification alone.^{^} Shipments figures based on certification alone.
